RFA Bacchus (A404) was a stores ship of the Royal Fleet Auxiliary (RFA). She was the third ship to bear this name.

Built by Henry Robb of Leith for the British-India Steam Navigation Company (later P & O) and operated by the RFA on a long-term bareboat charter. She was designed to carry naval stores from UK to overseas Naval bases, she pioneered containerisation with "Chacons", small wooden containers developed at Chatham Dockyard.

Bacchus was returned to her owners on 1 October 1981, and renamed Cherry Lanka on 6 November 1981. She scrapped at Gadani Beach on 31 December 1985.

Her sister-ship,  caught fire and was a constructive total loss in 1978 in Gibraltar.

References

Ships of the Royal Fleet Auxiliary
1962 ships